Umme Kulsum Smrity is a Bangladesh Awami League politician and the Member of Parliament from Gaibandha-3.

Early life
Smrity was born on 1 June 1963. She graduated with a law degree.

Career
Smrity was elected to parliament from reserved seat as a Bangladesh Awami League candidate in 2014. She is the General Secretary of the Central Committee of Bangladesh Krishak League. She was elected to Parliament from Gaibandha-3 in an by-election on 21 March 2020.

References

Awami League politicians
Living people
1963 births
10th Jatiya Sangsad members
Women members of the Jatiya Sangsad
21st-century Bangladeshi women politicians
21st-century Bangladeshi politicians